Madhuri may refer to:

People

Mononym
 Madhuri (singer)
 Madhuri (Tamil actress), Indian actress

Given name 
 Madhuri Bhattacharya (born 1982), Indian actress and model
 Madhuri Dixit (born 1967), Indian actress
 Madhuri Mehta (born 1991), Indian cricketer
 Madhuri Misal, leader of Bharatiya Janata Party

Surname 
 Geetha Madhuri (born 1985), Indian artist, composer and singer
 P. Madhuri (born 1943), South Indian playback singer

Films 
 Madhuri (1989 film), a Kannada film directed by K. V. Jayaram
 Madhuri (2018 film), a Marathi film

Albums 
 Madhuri (album), a 2005 album by Zubeen Garg.

Hindu given names
Indian feminine given names